Pluto x Baby Pluto is a collaborative studio album by American rappers Future and Lil Uzi Vert. It was released on November 13, 2020, and was previewed through several trailers starting from July 2020.

The title signifies the combination of both artists' nicknames: Future is referred to as Pluto, previously expressed through his 2012 debut album Pluto; while Lil Uzi Vert identifies as Baby Pluto, previously expressed through the song "Baby Pluto". It is the second project released by Future in 2020, following High Off Life. It is also the third project released by Lil Uzi Vert in the year, following Eternal Atake and its deluxe reissue, notably after a lack of music released by Uzi between 2018 and 2019.

A deluxe version of the album was released on November 17, 2020, four days following the release of Pluto x Baby Pluto.

Background and promotion
Both Future and Lil Uzi Vert blanked their Instagram pages on July 21, 2020, and proceeded to upload a visual teaser directed by Hype Williams, intended to announce an upcoming project titled "Pluto x Baby Pluto". On July 31, 2020, Lil Uzi's 26th birthday, the duo released two joint songs titled "Patek" and "Over Your Head", both of which would later turn out to be on the deluxe edition of the album. On September 22, a video featuring the two rappers playing soccer with several women was uploaded. On November 11, 2020, both artists officially announced the joint project on their social media via another trailer. The visual sees the two rappers discussing whether to leave Earth for another planet. The cover art and tracklist were revealed on November 12.

Commercial performance
Pluto x Baby Pluto debuted at number two on the US Billboard 200 with 105,000 album-equivalent units (including 5,500 pure album sales) in its first week. This became Future's fourteenth US top-ten album, as well as Lil Uzi's third. The album also accumulated a total of 136.11 million on-demand US streams from all its tracks, in the week ending November 28, 2020.

Track listing
Track listing adapted from Tidal.

Notes
  signifies an uncredited co-producer
 "Because of You" samples and interpolates elements of the A. G. Cook remix of 2017 Danny L Harle single, "Me4U", featuring Morrie.

Charts

Weekly charts

Year-end charts

References

2020 albums
Collaborative albums
Future (rapper) albums
Lil Uzi Vert albums
Epic Records albums
Atlantic Records albums
Albums produced by Wheezy
Albums produced by Zaytoven
Albums produced by London on da Track